225th Street may refer to the following stations of the New York City Subway:

225th Street (IRT White Plains Road Line), in the Bronx; serving the  trains
Marble Hill – 225th Street (IRT Broadway – Seventh Avenue Line), in Manhattan; serving the  train